Gerry Reynolds may refer to:

Gerry Reynolds (broadcaster), Irish journalist, broadcaster and television producer
Gerry Reynolds (British politician) (1927–1969), British Labour Party MP for Islington North (1958–1969)
Gerry Reynolds (Irish politician) (born 1961), Irish Fine Gael politician, former senator and TD

See also 
Gerald Reynolds (disambiguation)
Jerry Reynolds (disambiguation)